The Morong Command was a battalion of Filipino soldiers and resistance fighters led by General Licerio Gerónimo during the Philippine–American War. This force was responsible for the victories in the Battle of Paye, the Battle of Pulang Lupa, along with several other successful guerrilla raids and captures of enemy units. They even managed to recapture many American-held towns.

Constant skirmishes and battles with the Philippine Constabulary and the U.S. Army tolled heavily on the battalion. On March 29, 1901, General Geronimo surrendered in San Mateo, Rizal.

References

Philippine–American War
History of Rizal